The 2010 Indiana Hoosiers football team represented Indiana University Bloomington during the 2010 NCAA Division I FBS football season. As members of the Big Ten Conference, the Hoosiers were led by head coach Bill Lynch and played their home games at Memorial Stadium in Bloomington, Indiana. They finished the season 5–7, 1–7 in Big Ten play. Lynch was fired November 28, 2010, despite having won the team's last game of the season against rival Purdue the previous day.

Schedule

Game summaries

Towson

Western Kentucky

Akron

Michigan

Ohio State

Arkansas State

Illinois

Northwestern

Iowa

Wisconsin

Penn State

Purdue

    
    
    
    
    
    
    
    
    
    
    

Notes
Indiana beat Purdue in West Lafayette for the first time since 1996.
Indiana snaps a 12-game Big Ten losing streak and a 15-game conference road losing streak.
Ben Chappell breaks the single-season school record for passing yardage with 3,295 (3,043 – Kellen Lewis, 2007).

2011 NFL draftees

References

Indiana
Indiana Hoosiers football seasons
Indiana Hoosiers football